The Lost Trailers is the fourth studio album of American country music group The Lost Trailers. It was released to BNA Records on August 29, 2006. It produced two singles: "Call Me Crazy" and "Why Me", which peaked at number 43 and number 45, respectively, on the Hot Country Songs charts.

Blake Chancey produced the album, with additional co-production from group members Ryder Lee and Stokes Nielson on "Gravy".

Critical reception

Jeff Tamarkin of Allmusic rated the album 3 out of 5 stars, praising the band's sound and concluding, "Although the Lost Trailers veer at times (though not often enough for it to be a problem) toward cliché lyrically, and bar-band generics in their song structures, there's no mistaking the honesty inherent in this music." Dan McIntosh of Country Standard Time gave a mixed review, noting the band's rock influences but criticizing the song choices by saying, "The Lost Trailers are a little bit like the dwelling places they're named after: they're functional for travel or as a temporary residences, but most listeners will not want to live in 'em."

Track listing

Personnel

The Lost Trailers
Ryder Lee - acoustic guitar, keyboards, background vocals 
Manny Medina - bass guitar, electric guitar, background vocals 
Andrew Nielson - bass guitar, harmonica, keyboards, background vocals 
Stokes Nielson - electric guitar, lead vocals 
Jeff Potter - drums, background vocals

Additional Musicians
Nanette Bohannon - background vocals 
Pat Buchanan - electric guitar 
Joe Chemay - bass guitar
Lisa Cochran - background vocals 
Perry Coleman - background vocals 
Steve Ebe - drums
Mel Eubanks - banjo
Rusty Golden - keyboards
Vicki Hampton - background vocals 
Tony Harrell - keyboards
Wes Hightower - background vocals 
George Marinelli Jr. - electric guitar 
Mark Matejka - slide guitar
David Lee Murphy - background vocals 
Billy Panda - acoustic guitar 
Tony Paoletta - steel guitar
Cindy Richardson-Walker - background vocals

Chart performance

Album

Singles

References

2006 albums
BNA Records albums
The Lost Trailers albums
Albums produced by Blake Chancey